is a Japanese manga series written and illustrated by Ototachibana. A 12-episode anime television series adaptation aired between April and July 2016.

Plot
After the tragic death of his mother, Chihiro Komiya, an orphaned fourth grader in elementary school, is left with no close relatives or even a place to live. This all changes when he meets Madoka Takatori, a wealthy but eccentric young man who is revealed to be his long lost uncle from his mother's side of the family; when Madoka noticed that Chihiro has nowhere else to go, he decides to take in the young boy to live with him. However, when Chihiro first sees his uncle's large mansion all messed up and filled with nothing but garbage (since it's always like that) he decides to employ himself as Madoka's official housekeeper while wearing a frilly maid uniform and getting paid with allowance every month.

Characters

An elementary school student who begins working as a maid at his wealthy uncle's home after his mother dies. He is a clean freak and a terrific cook and can be strict but caring to his uncle. He is mature for his age, having been taught by his mother that those who don't work don't eat; he is also friendly and extremely independent for his age. He can be stubborn and has a short temper but means well. He is the type of person who would restrain himself and not ask for things he wanted since he grew up poor but has grown to rely and depend on his uncle. He is very intelligent, getting straight A's and has aspirations to be a hotel baron.

Chihiro's eccentric uncle, who makes costumes and takes him in on the condition that he take over the cleaning of the house. He tends to be lazy, easygoing and makes a huge mess, but cares for his nephew and is a genuinely kind and gentle person. He loves cats but is allergic to them and dislikes dogs due to a past childhood trauma. He is not good with strangers and not up to date with popular culture, particularly since he doesn't own a TV (though they eventually buy one). He is not picky about food and is good at baking sweets. He particularly loves frills and frilly clothing. Though he doesn't get along with his mother, Kazusa Takatori, due to a childhood experience, he realizes there's more to her.

He is Madoka's secretary who makes sure he makes his costumes and is on schedule. He is serious but kind and treats Chihiro amiably. He loves sushi and pudding and has been with Madoka (along with a young Chiyo and Miyako) since childhood. He dislikes Madoka's eccentricity and laziness and always scolds him for bringing in stray cats. He gets along well with Chihiro, acting like a second parent since they are both serious, hard-working, and rather mature (and makes sure Madoka gets his work done). He seems oblivious (or is feigning obliviousness) to Miyako's feelings for him.

A kind cheerful young heiress formerly engaged to Madoka since her grandfather and the former head of the Ōtori family were friends before her father broke it off (due to Madoka's involvement). She feels bound by her father and wonders if she is being selfish and should live as her father tells her but Chihiro encourages her to follow her heart. She has romantic feelings for Keiichiro and is a terrific cook,specializing in western cooking and making pudding (basically since it is Keiichiro's favorite), but tends to make a mess when she cooks, since she learned cooking from Madoka and she is also bad at cleaning. She is currently under training from Chihiro, to learn cooking and cleaning. She owns a pet dog given to her by Chihiro. She named her dog, Antaro. She is good friends with Madoka and Chihiro.

One of Chihiro's three friends and his main best friend. He is the middle of six children in the Hino family and is concerned about Chihiro since his mother's death, proving to be a loyal friend. He has silver hair. His family owns three dogs and are carpenters. He likes spicy food and is good friends with Madoka (his family having worked as Madoka's gardeners for years). He loves horror films.

The youngest member of a boy band called Uchouten boys. He is young and friendly and can be somewhat childish, but dislikes being treated like a child. He went to Madoka to ask for a change in his design since he stopped wanting to look like a kid by wearing shorts but was refused. He realizes he is made to wear shorts since his legs are considered attractive and that he shouldn't be afraid to show them off (with a little help from Chihiro and Madoka). As an idol, he is not as talented as the other members, but is a hard worker. He can be forgetful, considering he forgot to report his lost wallet and phone to the police and even a little clumsy since he told his group mates where he went by mistake but he is caring.

 One of the leader of the idol group Uchouten boys. He is tall with black hair, handsome and mature for his age and emits a dazzling aura. He looks out for Ryuji like a younger brother. When stressed, he plays with Ryuji's hair, which is a replacement for stroking the fur of a cat he owned when young.

One of the members of Uchouten boys. He has a princely character that hides a fiery temper but is caring towards his group mates.

Chihiro's eccentric mother whom he has a strong resemblance to. She cut off relations with her family after she disgraced her father by giving birth to a child with a man he opposed her marriage to. Her husband died shortly after Chihiro was born. She lived a poor but happy life with her son but died of a heart attack due to overwork. Her motto was "Those who don't work don't eat" and was bad at cooking except for tamagoyaki.

The mother of Madoka and Chiyo and grandmother of Chihiro. According to Keiichiro, the two didn't get along, even before Chiyo left. When Chihiro watches her try to pet the cat, it embarrasses her.

A classmate and friend of Chihiro's from school. He has reddish brown hair and orange eyes.

Another classmate and friend of Chihiro's from school. He has dark green hair, olive green eyes, and wears glasses.

A female classmate of Chihiro from school; she has romantic feelings for Chihiro. She has dark purple hair that is usually worn in a ponytail.

One of Yūji Hino's siblings. She is a happy and energetic little girl that is into princesses. She doesn't like anyone get into her personal stuff especially her brother.

Media

Manga
Ototachibana launched the series in Enterbrain's B's-Log Comic magazine on 12 March 2008, and it concluded on 1 March 2017. An audio drama CD was included with the limited edition of the sixth volume in April 2013.

Volumes

Anime
A 12-episode anime television series adaptation, directed by Yusuke Yamamoto and produced by Eight Bit, aired between 8 April and 1 July 2016 on TBS, and also aired on CBC, Sun TV, and BS-TBS. The series is written by Yoshiko Nakamura, with character designs by Kana Ishida. The opening theme song is "Innocent promise" by Trustrick, and the ending theme song is  performed by Natsuki Hanae, Taku Yashiro, and Kazutomi Yamamoto.

A spin-off titled  focuses on the fictional Uchōten Boys idol group. The first episode first aired on Niconico on 14 March 2016, and was followed by regular episodes beginning on 11 April 2016.

Episode list

Notes

References

External links

  at B's-Log Comic 
  
 

Anime series based on manga
Comedy anime and manga
Eight Bit (studio)
Enterbrain manga
Fictional domestic workers
Funimation
Kadokawa Dwango franchises
Shōjo manga
TBS Television (Japan) original programming